Sixth-seeded Ann Haydon defeated Yola Ramírez 6–2, 6–1 in the final to win the women's singles tennis title at the 1961 French Championships.

Seeds
The seeded players are listed below. Ann Haydon is the champion; others show the round in which they were eliminated.

  Darlene Hard (fourth round)
  Maria Bueno (quarterfinals)
  Margaret Smith (quarterfinals)
  Christine Truman (quarterfinals)
  Yola Ramírez (finalist)
  Ann Haydon (champion)
  Sandra Reynolds (fourth round)
  Florence De La Courtie (third round)
  Jan Lehane (fourth round)
  Zsuzsi Körmöczy (semifinals)
  Renée Schuurman (fourth round)
  Mary Reitano (fourth round)
  Vera Suková (fourth round)
  Deidre Catt (third round)
  Lesley Turner (fourth round)
  Edda Buding (semifinals)

Draw

Key
 Q = Qualifier
 WC = Wild card
 LL = Lucky loser
 r = Retired

Finals

Earlier rounds

Section 1

Section 2

Section 3

Section 4

Section 5

Section 6

Section 7

Section 8

References

External links
   on the French Open website

1961 in women's tennis
1961
1961 in French women's sport
1961 in French tennis